This is the discography of American rap duo Young Gunz.

Albums

Studio albums

Mixtapes

Singles

Music videos

See also 
 State Property discography

References

Discographies of American artists
Hip hop discographies